Yun Hyon-seok (August 7, 1984 – April 26, 2003) was a South Korean LGBT poet, writer and LGBT activist. 
He committed suicide in protest against discrimination against homosexuals in South Korea. During his life, he fought against social discrimination, racism and homophobia.

From the 2000s until his death, he was a controversial figure in the eyes of the public and fought against opponents of homosexuality and homosexual psychopath theorists. Throughout his school years, he had been pushed away from a similar peer group. In December 2002, he planned to leave school in order to attend Seil High School. From 1999 to 2003, he was active in the anti-LGBT discrimination movement, the LGBT rights movement, and homophobia opposition movement. In 2001, he debuted in literary world, involving himself in poetry, writing and columnist activities also, but mainly poetry. He received much discrimination and was the victim of prejudice, because of his sexual identity. In 2002, he joined the Solidarity for LGBT Human Rights of Korea, and was also a peace activist and a conscientious objector to military service. Up until his death, he wrote more poetry and prose, but his work was rejected, as he was gay.

After 2000 he was involved in an LGBT human rights, anti-discrimination, disability rights, and an anti-war peace movement.

On April 26, 2003, Yun drank two Korean distilled spirits and hanged himself, as a result of the homophobia and closed-mindedness in South Korea. Because of his death, obscene words against homosexual and transgender individuals were revoked and protection was somewhat implemented through the South Korean Youth Protection Act (청소년 보호법). He wrote under the pen name Yook Woo Dang (육우당, 六友堂, home of six friends) and Seolheon (설헌, 雪軒) and was also known by his nickname Midong (미동, 美童, beautiful boy) or Donghwa(동화, 童花, Boy flower). His Catholic baptismal name was "Antonio".

Life

Early life 
Hyon-seok was born in 1984, at Bupyong, Incheon. He was born into a devoted Roman Catholic family, and was baptised with the name "Antonio". His family were school teachers. He was bullied throughout his school years, and eventually dropped out of Incheon High School in 2002. As a result of this bullying, he often took tranquillisers, and sleeping pills. In 1999, Yun was part of discussions and disputes on the Internet forums, and endured a great deal of homophobia until his death. Yun created an Interpia 98 homepage, but his website was visited by an internet terrorist, and due to personal attacks in 2002, he closed his homepage.

He awoke to his sexual identity during his time in middle school. He was recognized for his sexual identity problems, and as a result of this, he was picked on. Later he was excluded by his peer group and his neighbourhood due to discrimination. On October 8, 2002, he was sent to a psychiatric clinic by his family, despite his emphatic claims that he was not a psychopath. He was dependent on green tea, rosary, tobacco, alcohol, foundation and hypnotics, which became known metaphorically as his "six friends" as Korean writer Kwak Byong-chan was based on his one nickname Yook Woo-dang, which also means "six friends" in the Korean language. In his last years of life, it was Yun's favorite phrase for the majority of his activity and content, and was used as a signature.

His family disapproved of his homosexuality and pressured him to be heterosexual, but Yun said, "I can't be heterosexual and don't want to be heterosexual." He was thoroughly isolated, about which he would complain in his diary. In October 2002, one diary entry from Yun said, "I do not think I'm abnormal. In this world born and living right-handed, also naturally left-handed is born and living. This road exists as also another road exists. Most persons use the well-worn path, but I have to go on a lone desolate path." He enjoyed reading, The Diary of Anne Frank and Thus Spoke Zarathustra.

Poetry and writings 
During his adolescence, he tried to drown his pain in writing and also went to volunteer in orphanages and disabled groups. Some famous quotes from his works include the following:

 "The world is hatred to like monster for we / So we living lurking place here and there / do you know, but this we is one of human. (Complain)"

 "Before you say, going to heaven to believe in Jesus Christ/ Pastor! begin with you first conduct. / after death, you when excuse see to Jesus?(one Pastor)"

Another famous poem by Yun, "Reborn", reads:

 "My soul was transform for the flower rain / after I went to your side / You are so insensibility to this me / Dear You please listen to My sweet soft whisper."

Yun hinted of the censorship present in South Korean society through his many works and stories. He often embedded satire within his poems, prose, novels and social criticism, yet still sang softly about love.

After completing elementary school, Yun wrote poetry and prose, but the majority of his work was given the notoriety to not be seen or read, due to his sexual identity. In his writings, he openly confessed his disappointment in prejudices and conventions, superstition and the remnants of blind faith, and the tradition of clinging to old customs, which strongly dominated the lives of many in South Korea.

 "Possibly before die, never I will not get a good evaluation eponymous poet. A heterosexual and asceticism and moralism, formalism aim for this society, because I am only just heretic and deviants."

He harbored ill feelings towards South Korean political leaders due to the institutionalized homophobia rampant in South Korea, and because the majority of South Korean political figures were opposed to homosexuality, feeling that it violated traditional social norms and values.

He was deeply upset by the assertion by political figures that his work violated traditional Korean social mores, due to the conservative attitudes prevalent in South Korean society.

LGBT rights movement 

From March 1, 2000, he attended Seil High-school in Bupyeong-gu. However, in December 2002, he dropped out of high school. After leaving school, he moved to the Dongdaemun District in Seoul and became involved in the literary and LGBT activist scene. Due to the widespread criticism of the homosexual themes in his writings, especially by fundamental Christians, he was unable to write under his real name despite wanting to do so. Instead he used the pseudonym Yook Woo Dang, a reference to the six objects he relied on most - green tea, cosmetic foundation, alcohol, tobacco, rosary beads and sleeping pills.
After the year 2000, Yun objected to the theory that HIV and related infections are directly transmitted by homosexuals, who were considered to be vectors for the virus. In his objection, he stated that the theory was a groundless assumption. Early on in the movement, he was a person who persuaded people that homophobia was unacceptable and fought against discriminatory objections to homosexuality on the internet. In January 2002, he became a long-distance activist. In January 2001, he joined the D Sijo(시조 詩調) poet club and W Sijo poet club, with a rank as a student member. He continued his activity and contributed many writings, including poetry, to Sijo for a period of two years. In February 2001, he joined and later worked for the organization Solidarity for LGBT Human Rights of Korea. He also became a conscientious objector to Korea's conscription military service. Yun emphasised that viewing homosexuality as sinful and denying acceptance for homosexuals as 'children of God' is wrong, whereas some Conservative Christian groups' ideology viewed it as anti-biblical activity.

In autumn of 2002, Yun sought after more volunteers or full-time employees for the Solidarity for LGBT Human Rights of Korea. His earnest desires were approved for March of the following year.

Other activity 
In January 2003, he was hired to work in a gay bar in Gangnam-gu, Seoul. However, due to anxiety, he soon retired from the job. Afterwards, parallel with several part-time jobs, he committed to become a civil and human rights activist. On March 24, 2003, he became a full-time employee of Solidarity for LGBT Human Rights of Korea. He participated in media censorship-opposition movements. Yun was repetitively insistent, particularly with some South Koreans who were intent on trampling many artists, entertainers and writers, even though pop culture was fresh with a variety of creativity and various artists. They were condemned in the name of morals and ethics.

Yun was an LGBT rights activist, and during this time participated in the abolition movement of LGBT and LGBT related media which was regarded as "youth Harmful media specified"(청소년 유해 매체). At the same time, he always attended anti-war and peace rallies in Jongro, Seoul. Slowly, he became the leading representative in anti-war and peace movements  as a guest speaker. Additionally, he participated in an opposition campaign in Seoul which aimed to prevent the government from sending troops overseas to participate in the Iraq war. On April 3, he was a determined participant in the Conscientious objection to military service(양심적 병역 거부). Yun declared his refusal the wholesale slaughter of innocent peoples. Also, he participated in the sex worker rights movement and antidiscrimination movements, sex workers discrimination opposition movements. also with joint to Ableism objection movements.

Conflict with fundamentalist Christianity 
South Korean fundamentalist Christians and some South Korean Christian denominations hated on homosexuality. For a long time, fundamentalist Christians and some Christian denominations believed that homosexuals and transgender individuals were "crazy". In the year 2000, Yun disputed with them. Yun insisted that homosexuality was not a mental illness and that it was personal taste. Although Yun was a devout Catholic, there was an immense amount of criticism by Christianity on homosexuality. It is known that he largely despaired.

On April 2, 2003, the South Korean National Human Rights Commission of Korea Association made a formal announcement that the LGBT and LGBT-related media regarded as "youth Harmful media specified" was human rights abuse. He was welcoming and at the same time condemning of some of the more Christian groups, while government agencies instigated that there was sexual corruption. Yun debated them by setting forth counterarguments and objections to contribute to daily newspapers. Two day later, some South Korean conservative Christian groups said, "Sodom and Gomorrah was destroyed to the wrath of God for judgment of sulfur, sexual depravity because homosexuals. the Bible strictly forbids homosexuality. Commission has to withdraw the decision."; they argued that homosexuality disrupted the natural order and caused HIV infection. On April 7, he said:

"Homosexuals is one of people, ye is dangerous psychopath also see to one of Human, anyway ye is Homosexuals is only see to non-human animals, demons?"

He vigorously protested, but his objections were viewed to still not be acceptable, so on April 13 he made a real name contribution to Hnagyeorye:

On April 11, he withdrew from Catholic society, causing a backlash of Christian fundamentalist homophobia, which was later taken back in the following two days. Afterwards, he prayed daily, with a desire for homosexuals to not be discriminated by his God. Yun Hyon-seok was determined to commit suicide from this point, due to the anger and hatred against many homosexual Christians.

Death and commemoration 
In April 2003, Hyon-seok and other human-rights activists were making preparations for a May Day meeting. For a long time, he was a devout Christian, despite the criticism from other Christians because of his sexual identity. Yun had been disappointed for a long time, but he was devoted to his religion. He had immediately suffered homosexual discrimination and contempt. On 26 April 2003, he committed suicide at Dongdaemun street in Seoul by hanging himself. On April 26 at 3:00 pm, Yun was reported to have been drinking alcohol. Two days before his death, Yun created a six-page suicide note.

On 3:00 pm of that day, Yun's suicide note described the discrimination against homosexuals in Korean society. He bequeathed ₩ 340,000 and the Rosary. His suicide note read:

 "I am unencumbered. After death, I say unabashedly outspoken to you, that say OOO is Gay, and I do not need any more sadness, and pain does not anymore. [...] if after I die, I can give to hypocrite Christians perception, my death is never not sad."

 "Thoughtless prejudice and world equals was one people, how some more people murdered, it's how cruel and anti-Bible, inhumane."

The letter concluded with: "I believe My Father God will accept me!"

Beside his corpse lay some waste paper and two bottles, leading some to believe that before his death, he had been drinking Korean distilled spirits. Another keepsake of his was the Cross and pictures of the "Holy Mother".

He was 18 years of age.

On April 27 after being discovered by a member of Solidarity for LGBT Human Rights of Korea (SLRK), his body was cremated. A posthumous collection of his work was published in 2006.

Legacy 
Yun left a will, to continue to fight against prejudice and discrimination. In his will was written:
 "My lovely brothers and sisters! Everyone's efforts to change the world."

On April 29, 2003, in the wake of his death, the South Korean government's designated obscene slang words towards homosexuality were removed.

Yun's death was intentionally ignored and disregarded by some homophobic Christians of South Korea. On April 29, the annulment of the prohibition for LGBT and LGBT-related media regarded as "youth-harmful media" was decided. It was abolished a year after his death. On April 21, 2006, one part of his poems and prose was published at the three-year anniversary of his death as a tribute in Seoul.

Books 
 Yook Woo Dang: 《Let My Spirit Rain Down as Flower Petals》(육우당: 내 혼은 꽃비 되어) (2013) 
 《Diary of Yook Woo Dang》(육우당일기 六友堂日記, unpublished)

Miscellaneous 
In addition to "Yook Woo Dang" he also used the pen name "Seolheon" in reference to pre-modern Korean poet Heo Nanseolheon (허난설헌, 許蘭雪軒).

See also 
 LGBT rights in South Korea
 LGBT history in South Korea
 Recognition of same-sex unions in South Korea
 Solidarity for LGBT Human Rights of Korea
 Conscription in South Korea
 Jeon Tae-il
 Emily Wilding Davison
 Sylvia Plath

References

Sources 
 Lee Kyong-hwa, 《나》 (바람의 아이들, 2005)
 Han Chae-yun, 《하느님과 만난 동성애》 (차별없는 세상을 위한 기독인연대, 2010)
 Chi Seung-ho, 《후천성 인권 결핍 사회를 아웃팅하다:두려움에서 걸어 나온 동성애자 이야기》 (시대의창, 2011)
 Chung Yeol. Bravo Gay life (Nareumbooks, 2011)
 Korean Homosexual Rights Association, 《작은무지개들의 비밀일기》 (Korean Homosexual Rights Association, 2011)
 동성애자도 인권 존중해야 약자희생 모는 편견 곤란 Hangyeorye 2003.04.13 
 [어린이책] 나는 나, 남과 조금 다를 뿐이야 경향신문 2006.04.24
 ‘인권의 마지노선’ 차별금지법은 먼 나라 이야기 경향신문  2013.04.27
 시립도서관이 거부한 ‘동성애’ 소설
 기독교인들이여, 당신들의 신을 '죄의 늪'에서 구하라 프레시안 2013.05.09
 故 육우당 10주기…동성애인권단체 “학생인권조례 성적지향 조항 삭제 우려” 해럴드생생뉴스 2013.04.11
 “동성애는 사람이 사람 좋아하는 문제… 이상한가요”
 남편 사랑 못 받은 어머니, 동성애자 아들 만든다? 프레시안 2013.04.23
 10대 성 소수자들 "홍석천처럼 세상에 나가고 싶다" 프레시안 2013.04.24
 청소년 성소수자들, 거리에서 인권을 외치다 가톨릭뉴스 2012.04.23
 대한문 앞에서 '성소수자 인권 보장' 문화제 연합뉴스 2013.04.27

External links 

 Memorial of Yun Hyon-seok 
 Protecting sexual minorities Koreatimes 2013.08.23
 Queer Rights Activists in South Korea Step Up Efforts to Support LGBTQ Youth 
 육우당은 여전히 희망이 존재한다고 말하고... 참세상 2006.04.18 
 '무지개를 휘날리며 앞으로 나아가다' 오마이뉴스 2004.04.26 
 너희 생각, 우리 생각 똑같아 The Hankyoreh 2006.04.30 
 [10대가뛰어든세상] 청소년 동성애는 비행이라고? 한겨레 2003.06.15 
  동성애는 정신병 아니다 조선일보 2003.05.08 
 동성애자가 사탄? 너희는 파시스트 기독교인 경향신문 2012.01.25 
 누가 열아홉살 동성애자를 죽였나 오마이뉴스 2012.04.25 
 LGBT 건강 세상

1984 births
2003 suicides
South Korean male poets
South Korean LGBT rights activists
Gay poets
South Korean human rights activists
South Korean humanitarians
Suicides by hanging in South Korea
People from Incheon
South Korean columnists
South Korean pacifists
Former Roman Catholics
20th-century South Korean poets
20th-century pseudonymous writers
20th-century South Korean LGBT people
South Korean LGBT poets
South Korean gay writers